The 1973 Allan Cup was the Canadian senior ice hockey championship for the 1972–73 senior "A" season.  The event was hosted by the Orillia Terriers and Orillia, Ontario.  The 1973 playoff marked the 65th time that the Allan Cup has been awarded.

Teams
Orillia Terriers (Eastern Canadian Champions)
St. Boniface Mohawks (Western Canadian Champions)

Best-of-Seven Series
Orillia Terriers 12 - St. Boniface Mohawks 2
St. Boniface Mohawks 6 - Orillia Terriers 4
Orillia Terriers 8 - St. Boniface Mohawks 5
Orillia Terriers 11 - St. Boniface Mohawks 2
Orillia Terriers 8 - St. Boniface Mohawks 1

External links
Allan Cup archives 
Allan Cup website

Allan
Allan Cup
Sport in Orillia